The India – Sri Lanka HVDC Grid Interconnection is a proposed project to link the national grids of India and Sri Lanka. The project involves the construction of a HVDC connection between Madurai in southern India, and Anuradhapura in central Sri Lanka, through the Palk Strait. The link would measure  in length, including  of submarine cables, and would take more than three years to construct. It would be implemented by the Power Grid Corporation of India Limited and Ceylon Electricity Board.

India's grid is connected to Bangladesh, Bhutan, and Nepal. This project will link Sri Lanka with the rest of the South Asian grid.

Having been contemplated since 1970, the project has four implementation alternatives in consideration:
 Madurai–Anuradhapura
 Tuticorin–Puttalam
 Madurai–Puttalam
 Madurai–Anuradhapura (with back-to-back DC)

The second phase would enable a  transmission capacity, the target capacity.

It is expected to reach a total development cost of approximately US$800,000,000. Such a connection between the two countries would enable the nations to sell excess energy, thus saving valuable resources.

In February 2016, Damitha Kumarasinghe, Director general of Public Utilities Commission of Sri Lanka, announced that pre-feasibility studies on the project had been completed.

Additionally, the National Renewable Energy Laboratory in collaboration with Ceylon Electricity Board completed an operational analysis of the HVDC connection for one year of operations.

See also 
 High-voltage direct current
 List of HVDC projects
 List of power stations in Sri Lanka

References

External links 
 Ministry of Power & Energy (Sri Lanka)
 

Proposed electric power transmission systems
Electric power transmission infrastructure in India
Proposed electric power infrastructure in India
Proposed electric power infrastructure in Sri Lanka
2013 in India
Energy in Tamil Nadu
India–Sri Lanka relations
Proposed infrastructure in Tamil Nadu